The Gardemusik Wien (Guards Band Vienna in English) is one of nine military bands in Austria and is the seniormost band in the Austrian Armed Forces. Unlike its German counterparts in the Bundeswehr, the band lacks a corps of drums, which is the most essential part to the German format. It consists of 60 military musicians who provide musical accompaniment to the Gardebataillon, of which it is the official regimental band.

Brief History
It was created following the implementation of the Austrian State Treaty in September 1955. At the time of its creation, it was under the command of the Austrian national border guard department.  It has been under the command of the Austrian Land Forces since January 1956, when the Army Battalion took over all representative tasks in Vienna. By May 1957, the regiment was renamed to the Guards Battalion, therefore branding the band as the Gardemusik. The Gardemusik was the only Austrian military band to not be affected by the reduction in staff and cuts to its budget by the government in October 2014. The Gardemusik carries out an annual 15-week training course new recruits.

Tasks
The primary tasks of the Gardemusik are to provide support to ceremonial events such as accreditations of ambassadors, welcoming ceremonies, and parades and to conduct annual receptions for the diplomatic corps (mostly done by the symphonic wind orchestra). In addition to its main tasks, the Gardemusik produced over twenty recordings, in addition to military marches including recordings of works by Johann Strauss, Carl Michael Ziehrer and Joseph Lanner. The unit has a Sexennial tradition to compose a new military march in honor of the election of a new Federal President, which was more recently done for President Alexander Van der Bellen in 2017.

List of Leaders

The title of Director of Music (DOM) belongs to the highest ranking officer in the band, who is the de facto leader of the band. Currently, this position is held by Colonel Bernhard Heher. The DOM is assisted by the deputy director and the bandmaster.

Directors of Music
1956–1960: Gustav Gaigg 
1960–1971: Friedrich Hodick
1972–1975: Rudolf Bara
1975–2002: Johann Schadenbauer
Since 2002: Bernhard Heher

Deputy Directors
1963–1965: Franz Josef Kohsich
1965–1968: Anton Sollfellner 
1968–1969: Rudolf Bodingbauer 
1969–1971: Rudolf Bara
1990–1995: Hannes Lackner 
1997–2002: Bernhard Heher
Since 2005: Johann Kausz

Bandmasters
1956–1960: Josef Hahn
1960–1974: Johann Bauerstätter
1975–1980: Josef Hain
1980–993: Hermann Auer
1993–2011: Josef Höller 
Since 2011: Gerald Springer

Photos

See also

 Austrian Armed Forces
 Gardebataillon
 Military band

External Links
 Website of the Bundesheer - Gardemusik

References

Military bands
Military units and formations established in 1955
1955 establishments in Austria
Military units and formations of Austria
Musical groups established in 1955